Pokkiri Raja or Pokiri Raja may refer to
 Pokiri Raja, a 1995 Telugu film starring Venkatesh and Roja
 Pokkiri Raja (1982 film), a 1982 Tamil film starring Rajinikanth
 Pokkiri Raja (2010 film), a 2010 Malayalam film starring Mammootty and Prithviraj
 Pokkiri Raja (2016 film), a 2016 Tamil film starring Jiiva, Sibi Raj and Hansika Motwani.

See also
 Pokiri, a 2006 Indian Telugu-language action film
 Pokkiri, a 2007 Indian Tamil-language action film
 Raja (disambiguation)